Katie or Katy Dunn(e) may refer to:

Katie Dunn (boxer) in 2006 Women's World Amateur Boxing Championships
Katie Dunn, character played by Jennifer Dundas
Katie Dunn, character in Seconds Apart
 Katie Marie Dunn, participant in the 1999 Kingwood robbery incidents
Katy Dunne, tennis player

See also
Catherine Dunn (disambiguation)
Kathleen Dunn (disambiguation)